Michael Collins Piper (born Michael Bernard Piper; July 16, 1960 – May 2015) was an American political writer, conspiracy theorist and talk radio host.

Piper was a regular contributor to both The Spotlight and its successor, the American Free Press, newspapers backed by Willis Carto and noted for their antisemitic and  White separatist/White nationalist themes.

Piper was described on his website as a political "progressive in the La Follette-Wheeler tradition."

He wrote books such as The High Priests of War, in which he criticized the neoconservatives in the Bush administration, and Final Judgment, where he claimed that  Israel's Mossad, the CIA and organized crime was responsible for the assassination of U.S. President John F. Kennedy. He had been criticized by many organizations, including the Anti-Defamation League, the Simon Wiesenthal Center, and the Middle East Media Research Institute, which have described Piper as a promoter of antisemitic conspiracy theories and Holocaust denial.

Early life
Piper claimed his political engagement was inspired by his older brother's experience in the Vietnam War. He once said his late brother "never completely recovered from the physical and psychological impact of the war."

Radio show
In February 2006, he started a radio show called The Piper Report. Regular guests have included Mark Glenn (critic of Israel), former candidate for Texas state legislature Barbara Samuelson, and Christopher Bollyn (who occasionally filled in for Piper).

Piper commented about the war on Lebanon, the Mel Gibson affair (in which he derided Gibson for driving under the influence and for apologizing for his statements) and the battle between U.S. Senator Joe Lieberman (D-CT, later I-CT) and businessman Ned Lamont on August 8, 2006. Lamont defeated Lieberman in the Democratic primary, but lost to him in the general election. Piper defended alternative medicine, animal rights, and the past activities of Liberty Lobby and Willis Carto. He was featured as a guest on James Edwards' radio show, The Political Cesspool, which has also been accused of promoting antisemitism.

Kennedy and King assassination theories
According to Piper in Final Judgment: The Missing Link in the JFK Assassination Controversy, Israeli Prime Minister David Ben-Gurion orchestrated the assassination after learning that Kennedy planned to keep Israel from obtaining nuclear weapons.

Piper claimed the assassination "was a joint enterprise conducted on the highest levels of the CIA, in collaboration with organized crime — and most specifically, with direct and profound involvement by the Israeli intelligence service, the Mossad." Piper also alleged that Jewish mobster Meyer Lansky and the Anti-Defamation League (ADL) were linked to the murder. The ADL responded with harsh criticisms, called the claims ridiculous, and denounced Final Judgment as antisemitic.

Piper wrote articles in American Free Press which alleged that the Mossad and the FBI conspired to set up the assassination of Martin Luther King Jr. Piper claims this was motivated by fear of King's anti-Israel statements combined with his massive grassroots power.

Antisemitism controversy
According to his biography by American First Books, which identifies itself as promoting "white nationalism", the ADL repeatedly challenged statements made by Piper, and called him a promoter of antisemitic conspiracy theories, a Holocaust denier, and a defender of the Protocols of the Elders of Zion. The group says Piper traveled to the United Arab Emirates in 2003 to lecture on anti-Israeli and antisemitic themes. In one instance, the ADL stated that Piper had suggested that Israel was working on an "ethnic bomb" targeting only Arabs.

Piper responded to increasing ADL criticism through his 2006 book The Judas Goat, accusing the ADL of using unethical infiltration and information gathering techniques, such as the use of 'agents provocateurs'. He claimed to have begun a series of events that ultimately led to the ADL Files Controversy some years later. Writing in Asia Times, researcher and journalist Keith Bettinger says that Piper's views are "characteristic of an effort by anti-Semites and white supremacists to repackage themselves as 'alternative media voices' claiming to tackle stories the mainstream media in the US won't touch".

Iran
Piper was invited to Iran to speak at the International Conference On Review of the Holocaust: Global Vision 2006, and personally met with Iranian president Mahmoud Ahmadinejad, a Holocaust denier, during his New York City visit to address United Nations General Assembly. His book The New Jerusalem: Zionist Power in America, was on sale at the conference.

Death
Piper's body was discovered on May 30 or May 31, 2015 at the Budget Saver Motel in Coeur d'Alene, Idaho. The deputy coroner's report stated that the cause of death was a "probable Myocardial Infarction, Ischemic Cardiomyopathy and Coronary Artery Disease", and listed diabetes as another significant condition. The report indicated that toxicology results were consistent with her findings and that no autopsy was conducted. The article gave Piper's age as 54.

Books
 Best Witness: The Mel Mermelstein Affair, (1993) Center for Historical Review; 
 Final Judgment: The Missing Link in the JFK Assassination Conspiracy, (1993) The Wolfe Press; 
 The High Priests of War, (2004) American Free Press; 
 The New Jerusalem: Zionist Power in America, (2004) American Free Press; ASIN B000Y93216
 Target:  Traficant, The Untold Story, (2005) American Free Press; 
 The Confessions of an Anti-Semite : The First -Ever Critical Analysis of the Linguistic Legerdemain Underlying the Propaganda Techniques of the New World, 
 The Judas Goats, The Enemy Within, (2006) American Free Press; 
 The Golem: a World Held Hostage,  (2007) American Free Press; ASIN B0011DZG2W
 The New Babylon: Those Who Reign Supreme, (2009) American Free Press; 
 Ye Shall Know The Truth, (2013) American Free Press;

References

External links
Michael Collins Piper personal web site
America First Books (hosts Piper's works as ebooks)

1960 births
2015 deaths
American conspiracy theorists
American Holocaust deniers
American male non-fiction writers
American political writers
American white nationalists
Place of birth missing